Sandler is a Yiddish family name. A rarer variant is Sendler.

Notable people
 Adam Sandler (born 1966), American actor and comedian
 Barry Sandler (born 1947), American screenwriter and film producer
 Boris Sandler (born 1950), Yiddish-language author and journalist
Dale Sandler, American epidemiologist 
 Ethan Sandler (born 1973), American actor
 Herbert Sandler, American banker
 Karen Sandler is the executive director of the Software Freedom Conservancy, former executive director of the GNOME Foundation, an attorney, and former general counsel of the Software Freedom Law Center.
Irving Sandler (born July 22, 1925) is an American art critic, art historian, and educator. 
 Jackie Sandler (born 1974), American actress and wife of Adam Sandler
 Jonathan Sandler  (1982–2012), French rabbi assassinated on March 19th, 2012 with his two sons during the 2012 Midi-Pyrénées shootings in Toulouse  
 Joseph Sandler (born 1953), Washington, D.C. attorney
 Joseph J. Sandler (1927-1998), British psychoanalyst, President of the International Psychoanalytical Association from 1989 to 1993
 Karen Sandler, attorney
 Larry Sandler, American geneticist
 Lowenstein Sandler, a New Jersey based American law firm 
 Marion Sandler (October 17, 1930 – June 1, 2012) was the former co-CEO (with her husband Herbert Sandler) of Golden West Financial Corporation and World Savings Bank. 
 Örjan Sandler (born 28 September 1940) is a Swedish speed skater who competed in five Winter Olympics between 1964 and 1980.
 Paul Mark Sandler is a Maryland trial lawyer and author of numerous books on trial advocacy and litigation.
 Philippe Sandler, Dutch footballer
 Rickard Sandler (1884–1964), Prime Minister of Sweden (1925–1926)
 Ron Sandler, British banker
 Steven Sandler (born December 26, 1958) is an American inventor and businessman.
 Tony Sandler (born 1933), Belgian singer, entertainer and performer

Yiddish-language surnames
Jewish surnames
Occupational surnames